Ali Bernard Rojas Go (born 21 September 1976) is a Filipino former international footballer who played as a striker.

Playing career
Born in Bacolod, Go played club football for North Bar, Negros Occidental and Kaya.

He also earned fourteen international caps for the Philippines between 2000 and 2007, and participated at the 2002 Tiger Cup.

Coaching career
He later became Technical Director at Ceres–Negros. He also worked with the club as its head coach.

International goals
Scores and results list the Philippines' goal tally first.

References

1976 births
Living people
Filipino footballers
Footballers from Negros Occidental
Philippines international footballers
Sportspeople from Bacolod
United Football League (Philippines) head coaches
Ceres–Negros F.C. managers
Association football forwards
Filipino football head coaches